Bintou Malloum (31 March 1946 – 10 March 2020) was a Chadian politician, and the first ambassador of Chad to Germany, Republic of Congo, and Italy.

Biography
Malloum was born on 31 March 1946 in Torror, French Chad. Between 1993 and 2003, Malloum was Secretary of State, Secretary of Public Function, and Secretary of Labor. She also served thrice as Minister of Social Affairs and Family. In 1997, Malloum was the first female student at the Ecole Nationale d'Administration et de Magistrature in N'Djamena and the first woman to be a Chadian ambassador.

Tasked with serving in several corrupt administrations, Malloum was considered to be a person of great integrity. In February 2012, Malloum was a representative of the Rotary Club of Chad. She died on 10 March 2020, in N'Djamena, Chad, and was buried in the Lamadji Cemetery. Condolences to Malloum were sent by the President of Chad, Idriss Déby.

Works
Le destin d’une pionnière (2017)

References

1946 births
2020 deaths
Chadian women diplomats
People from Salamat Region
People of French Equatorial Africa
Social affairs ministers of Chad
Women government ministers of Chad
Ambassadors of Chad to Germany
Ambassadors of Chad to the Republic of the Congo
Ambassadors of Chad to Italy
Women ambassadors
21st-century Chadian women politicians
21st-century Chadian politicians